Frauke-Imke Eickhoff (born October 24, 1967) is a German former Olympic judoka.

She was born in Celle, Niedersachsen, Germany.

Judo career
She was affiliated with PSV Braunschweig, Braunschweig, Germany. She won the gold medal in the 1991 World Judo Championships in Barcelona, in the U61 weight class.

Eickhoff competed for Germany at the 1992 Summer Olympics in Barcelona at the age of 24, in judo in the Women's Half-Middleweight (61 kg). She was defeated by Israeli Yael Arad in a match of which the winner was certain to win at least a bronze medal.  She finished tied for fifth.

References 

Living people
People from Celle
Sportspeople from Lower Saxony
1967 births
German female judoka
Judoka at the 1992 Summer Olympics
Olympic judoka of Germany